Redwan Al-Mousa is a Saudi Arabian footballer who plays as a defender, most recently for Afif.

Honours

Club
Al-Hilal
Saudi Professional League (1): 2010-11
Crown Prince Cup (2): 2010-11, 2011-12

Country
Saudi Arabia U-23
UNAF U-23 Tournament (1): 2011

External links
soccerpunter.com Profile

ultrasclub.com Profile

Al Hilal SFC players
1990 births
Living people
Saudi Arabian footballers
Al-Shoulla FC players
Al-Ansar FC (Medina) players
Bisha FC players
Afif FC players
Saudi Professional League players
Saudi Second Division players
Saudi Fourth Division players
Association football defenders
Saudi Arabia youth international footballers